History Alive was a short lived live-action educational series originally produced in early 1970s by Walt Disney Educational. The series dealt with American history. The main Supervisor of this series was Turnley Walker. Later school textbooks were made with the name history alive. These text books are used to teach world history all around the U.S.

Films

1972
Democracy - Equality or Privilege? - Shows the disagreement between Thomas Jefferson and Alexander Hamilton in the 1790s about the management of a government
Impeachment of a President - on the indictment of Andrew Johnson by Thaddeus Stevens
The Right of Dissent, - on the confrontation between John Adams and Matthew Lyon in 1798
The Petition of Right, - on John Quincy Adams and Thomas Marshall fight on a bill limiting anti-slavery petitions
State's Rights - on the opposition between Andrew Jackson and John Caldwell Calhoun about the tariffs of 1832

Notes

Disney documentary films
Films about presidents of the United States
Disney educational films
Disney short film series
1972 films
1970s educational films
1970s American films